The 1871 Maryland gubernatorial election took place on November 7, 1871.

Incumbent Democratic Governor Oden Bowie did not seek re-election.

Democratic candidate William Pinkney Whyte defeated Republican candidate Jacob Tome.

General election

Candidates
William Pinkney Whyte, Democratic, former U.S. Senator
Jacob Tome, Republican, businessman, former State Senator

Results

Notes

References

1871
Gubernatorial
Maryland